In enzymology, a sinapoylglucose---sinapoylglucose O-sinapoyltransferase is an enzyme that catalyzes the chemical reaction

2 1-O-sinapoyl beta-D-glucoside  D-glucose + 1,2-bis-O-sinapoyl beta-D-glucoside

Hence, this enzyme has one substrate, 1-O-sinapoyl beta-D-glucoside, and two products, D-glucose and 1,2-bis-O-sinapoyl beta-D-glucoside.

This enzyme belongs to the family of transferases, specifically those acyltransferases transferring groups other than aminoacyl groups.  The systematic name of this enzyme class is 1-O-(4-hydroxy-3,5-dimethoxycinnamoyl)-beta-D-glucoside:1-O-(4-hydro xy-3,5-dimethoxycinnamoyl-beta-D-glucoside 1-O-sinapoyltransferase. Other names in common use include hydroxycinnamoylglucose-hydroxycinnamoylglucose, hydroxycinnamoyltransferase, 1-(hydroxycinnamoyl)-glucose:1-(hydroxycinnamoyl)-glucose, and hydroxycinnamoyltransferase.

References

 

EC 2.3.1
Enzymes of unknown structure